Sir William Honywood, 2nd Baronet (ca. 1654 – 8 June 1748) was an English politician who sat in the House of Commons from 1685 to 1695.

Honywood was the son of Sir Edward Honywood, 1st Baronet and his wife Elizabeth Maynard, daughter of Sir John Maynard of Tooting, Surrey. He inherited the baronetcy of Evington on the death of his father in 1670/ In 1685 Honywood was elected Mayor and member of parliament for Canterbury and held the seat until 1695.

Honywood married Anna Christiana Newman daughter of Richard Newman of Fifehead Magdalen in Dorset. They had two sons and four daughters. He died at Evington at the age of 94 and was buried at Elmstead. His grandson Edward succeeded in the baronetcy.

References

1650s births
1748 deaths
Baronets in the Baronetage of England
Politics of Canterbury
Year of birth uncertain
English MPs 1685–1687
English MPs 1689–1690
English MPs 1690–1695
English MPs 1695–1698
Mayors of Canterbury